Boonesborough is an unincorporated community in Fayette County, West Virginia, United States.

References 

Unincorporated communities in West Virginia
Unincorporated communities in Fayette County, West Virginia
Populated places on the Kanawha River